Todo el Amor (All the Love) is the fifth studio album by Chilean singer Myriam Hernández. The album was nominated "Latin Pop Album of the Year by a Female Artist"  at the 1999 Billboard Latin Music Awards. The album is her first under Sony Discos having previously signed on to Warner Music Latina. It contains the lead single "Huele a Peligro" which reached #1 on the Latin Pop Airplay chart in the United States.

Track listing
The information from AllMusic.

Charts

1998 albums
Myriam Hernández albums
Spanish-language albums
Sony Discos albums
Albums produced by Humberto Gatica
Albums produced by Walter Afanasieff